Kalevi Kosunen (born 17 January 1947) is a Finnish boxer. He competed in the men's light middleweight event at the 1976 Summer Olympics.

References

External links
 

1947 births
Living people
Finnish male boxers
Olympic boxers of Finland
Boxers at the 1976 Summer Olympics
People from Salla
Light-middleweight boxers
Sportspeople from Lapland (Finland)